The Worthington-Evans Baronetcy, of Colchester in the County of Essex, was a title in the Baronetage of the United Kingdom. It was created on 15 November 1916 for the Conservative politician Laming Worthington-Evans. The title became extinct on the death of his son, the second Baronet, in 1971.

Worthington-Evans baronets, of Colchester (1916)
Sir Laming Worthington-Evans, 1st Baronet (1868–1931)
Sir William Shirley Worthington Worthington-Evans, 2nd Baronet (1904–1971)

References

Extinct baronetcies in the Baronetage of the United Kingdom